
Gmina Gogolin is an urban-rural gmina (administrative district) in Krapkowice County, Opole Voivodeship, in south-western Poland.

The gmina contains part of the protected area called Góra Świętej Anny Landscape Park.

Villages
Apart from the town of Gogolin, Gmina Gogolin contains the villages and settlements of Chorula, Dąbrówka, Górażdże, Kamień Śląski, Kamionek, Malnia, Obrowiec, Odrowąż and Zakrzów.

Neighbouring gminas
Gmina Gogolin is bordered by the gminas of Izbicko, Krapkowice, Strzelce Opolskie, Strzeleczki, Tarnów Opolski and Zdzieszowice.

Twin towns – sister cities

Gmina Gogolin is twinned with:

 Jablunkov, Czech Republic
 Kysucké Nové Mesto, Slovakia
 Łodygowice, Poland
 Schongau, Germany
 Zwierzyniec, Poland

References

Gogolin
Krapkowice County